Night of the Corn People  is the fourth album by The Bags. Released on first CD and then on a color-vinyl Double LP, the latter done by Helter Skelter, both feature a sort of "main disc" which comprises the first twelve tracks (incidentally, this is also the entirety of the LP's first disc) and then seven track rock opera, "Waiting for Maloney". While the CD version also includes the single and its b-side, "Dr. Lb." (literally, "Dr. Pound") and "Frilly Underwear", the Double LP includes five previously unreleased tracks on the backside of the "Waiting for Malony" disc. This also marks the first time a Bags album was produced for CD.

In 2007, "The Mole" was featured on Air Guitar Nation. "I Smell a Rat" has also been covered by Sebadoh.

Track listing

1991 albums